Animal Crack-Ups is an ABC game show which aired in primetime from August 8 to September 12, 1987, after which it aired on Saturday mornings from September 12, 1987, to December 30, 1989, and again from June 2 to September 1, 1990. It was produced by ABC Productions in association with Vin Di Bona Productions (both companies also produce America's Funniest Home Videos) and hosted by Alan Thicke, who was on Growing Pains at the time. The program was based on a Japanese Tokyo Broadcasting System Television series, Wakuwaku Dōbutsu Land (わくわく動物ランド).

The show's theme song was "Animals Are Just Like People Too", created by Thickovit music (Alan and Todd Thicke and Gary Pickus).

Gameplay
Four celebrities competed. Host Thicke introduced a video clip about an animal; at some point, the video was paused and Thicke asked a question about the clip. The celebrities give their answers, after which the remainder of the clip was played, revealing the answer.

Any celebrities giving the correct answer received a point; score was kept by placing a stuffed animal (a monkey in the first season, a hedgehog in later seasons) in front of the celebrity's podium. Co-host Debi Bartlet provided the stuffed animals. The celeb with the most toy animals/points won the game and $2,500 for their favorite animal charity. If a tie occurred, the money was split between the charities.

On segues to two commercial breaks, a hedgehog puppet named "Reggie the Hedgie" (voiced by Susan Blu, performed by Lisa Sturz) gave animal facts to the home viewers and read home-viewer mail.

International versions

References

External links
 Vin Di Bona Productions
 
 Clip of the show's theme song with scenes of animals

1987 American television series debuts
1990 American television series endings
1980s American children's comedy television series
1990s American children's comedy television series
1980s American children's game shows
1990s American children's game shows
1980s American comedy game shows
1990s American comedy game shows
American Broadcasting Company original programming
American television series based on Japanese television series
American television shows featuring puppetry
English-language television shows
Television series about animals